= Raw agricultural product =

Raw agricultural product, as defined by the United States Federal Food, Drug, and Cosmetic Act, is “any food in its raw or natural state, including all fruits that are washed, colored, or otherwise treated in the unpeeled natural form prior to marketing.” The nonregulatory definition generally means any agricultural commodity that has undergone little or no processing.
